Kœtzingue is a commune in the Haut-Rhin department in Alsace in north-eastern France.

The composer and organist Alphonse Schmitt (1875–1912) was born in Kœtzingue.

See also
 Communes of the Haut-Rhin département

References

Communes of Haut-Rhin